Blackstone and the Scourge of Europe is a 1974 historical thriller novel by the British writer Derek Lambert, published under the pen name Richard Falkirk. It is the fourth in a series of six novels featuring Edmund Blackstone, a member of the Bow Street Runners in the pre-Victorian era. It is 1820 and George IV orders Blackstone to the island of St Helena, where the imprisoned former French Emperor Napoleon may be plotting to escape.

References

Bibliography
 Lynda G. Adamson. World Historical Fiction. Greenwood Publishing Group, 1999.

1974 British novels
Novels by Derek Lambert 
British historical novels
British thriller novels
Novels set in the 1820s
Methuen Publishing books